Satheesha Rai is an Indian weightlifter and Olympian from Mangalore, Karnataka. He is also a recipient of the Arjuna Award given in 1999. He won a gold medal and two silver medals in the 1998 Commonwealth Games. He also won two gold medals and a bronze medal in 2002 Commonwealth Games but the medal he won in 2002 was stripped because he tested positive for intaking a banned substance. Rai pleaded innocence and stated, "I have participated in over 16 International events including the Olympics and the World championships the Asian Games, the Commonwealth Games besides a host of Asian Weightlifting championships and SAF Games. And in all these Games too tests are mandatory and I have come through clean. Also just before the teams left for Manchester, Sports Authority of India (SAI) conducted tests thrice and unless it's negative we are informed,". but was subsequently served a life ban

References

Living people
Indian male weightlifters
Weightlifters at the 1996 Summer Olympics
Olympic weightlifters of India
Doping cases in weightlifting
Indian sportspeople in doping cases
Recipients of the Arjuna Award
Mangaloreans
Commonwealth Games gold medallists for India
Weightlifters from Karnataka
Weightlifters at the 1998 Asian Games
Commonwealth Games medallists in weightlifting
Year of birth missing (living people)
Weightlifters at the 1998 Commonwealth Games
Weightlifters at the 2002 Commonwealth Games
Asian Games competitors for India
20th-century Indian people
21st-century Indian people
Medallists at the 1998 Commonwealth Games